PC Mania is Bulgarian computer games media originally started as a computer magazine and transformed into on-line game media in the beginning of 2009. It is a prime Bulgarian on-line media source for gaming, Internet, and technology. It was established in 1998 and was the third Bulgarian computer games magazine after the brochure Top Games and the magazines Master Games and Gamers' Workshop. It is the oldest computer games media in the country and is indisputably the most popular media for computer entertainment in Bulgaria, having the biggest circulation and biggest readers span when it was distributed in paper version. The articles concern topics such as personal computer hardware, Internet technologies, computer and console games, news, etc.

PC Mania Magazine celebrated its 10th anniversary in 2008 and shortly after a major overhaul was carried out. In the spring of 2009 the magazine moved entirely on-line. The existing web page had been completely redesigned and expanded in order to serve the growing gaming community in Bulgaria. The feedback has been greatly improved with readers now being able to comment directly under the news and articles posted, as well as to discuss different topics on the designated forum. As of May 2009 pcmania.bg has approximately 45,000 unique weekly visitors, which positions the website on top of the most popular computer games web-media in Bulgaria and on 10th position in "Media and Information" websites for the country, and 19th position overall.

Features 

Game articles: previews, interviews, and reviews of new and upcoming games as well as game guides. The articles encompass PC, PS3, Xbox 360 and mobile games

News: latest news from the video game industry and technology

Topic of the week: an in-depth analyses of current gaming- and technology related issues

Personal opinion: editorials by PC Mania's team on different subjects

Hardware articles: reviews of computers, laptops, and other technology equipment

References

External links
 
 PC Mania IRC channel, part of the UniBG network

1998 establishments in Bulgaria
2009 disestablishments in Bulgaria
Magazines published in Bulgaria
Defunct magazines published in Bulgaria
Home computer magazines
Magazines established in 1998
Magazines disestablished in 2009
Mass media in Sofia
Monthly magazines
Online magazines with defunct print editions
Video game magazines
Defunct computer magazines
Bulgarian-language magazines
Online computer magazines